Isaac "Ike" Fulwood  Jr. (April 28, 1940 – September 1, 2017) was an American police officer who served as the Chief of the Metropolitan Police Department of the District of Columbia from July 1989 until September 1992. Chief Fulwood inherited a city plagued by high crime, a record homicide rate, as well as the height of the crack epidemic. His tenure was also marked by a strained relationship with Mayor Marion Barry, as Barry was arrested on federal drug charges just five months after Fulwood's appointment as police chief.

References

Chiefs of the Metropolitan Police Department of the District of Columbia
American police officers
African-American police officers
People from Washington, D.C.
1940 births
2017 deaths
20th-century African-American people
21st-century African-American people
 Eastern High School (Washington, D.C.) alumni